William Verner may refer to:

 Frank Verner (William Franklyn Verner, 1883–1966), athlete
 Sir William Verner, 1st Baronet (1782–1871), British soldier and politician
 Sir William Verner, 2nd Baronet (1822–1873), British soldier and politician
 Sir William Verner, 3rd Baronet (1855–1886), British baronet
 Willoughby Verner (William Willoughby Cole Verner, 1852–1922), British ornithologist